The Aggrolites is the self-titled album by a band of the same name, released in 2006. It is their second album overall and first on Hellcat.

Track listing
"Funky Fire" - 4:10
"Mr. Misery" - 3:34
"Time to Get Tough" - 2:23
"Thunder Fist" - 2:50
"Countryman Fiddle" - 3:49
"Work to Do" - 3:02
"Death at Ten Paces" - 2:53
"Someday" - 4:15
"The Volcano" - 3:03
"Heavier Than Lead" - 3:27
"Sound of Bomshell" - 2:57
"Fury Now" - 3:10
"5 Deadly Venoms" - 3:15
"Grave Digger" - 3:49
"Prisoner Song" - 3:52
"Love Isn't Love" - 3:49
"Sound by the Pound" - 3:48
"Lightning & Thunder" - 3:39
"A.G.G.R.O." - 4:24

All songs by The Aggrolites.

Personnel
Jesse Wagner - vocals, guitar
Brian Dixon - rhythm guitar
J Bonner - bass
Roger Rivas - organ, keyboards
Scott Abels - drums
Tom Cook - trombone
Eitan Avineri - trumpet
Jeff Roffredo - backing vocals
Gene Grimaldi - mastering
David Jiro - photography

References

The Aggrolites albums
Hellcat Records albums
2006 albums